Events from the year 1572 in India.

Events
Akbar annexes Gujarat and shifts the Mughal capital to Fatehpur Sikri.

Births

Deaths
 February 28 – Maharana Udai Singh, king of Mewar and the founder of the city of Udaipur, (born 1522)

See also

 Timeline of Indian history